Mauro José Mestriner (born 30 September 1977), simply known as Mauro, is a Brazilian football coach and former player who played as a goalkeeper. He is the current goalkeeping coach of Santos' under-20 team.

Playing career
Born in Mogi Mirim, São Paulo, Mauro made his senior debut with Mogi Mirim. In May 2001, after the club's relegation in the Campeonato Paulista, he was loaned to Santa Cruz.

In 2003, Mauro was a regular starter for Marília as the club reached the final stage of the year's Série B. On 17 December 2003, he signed a one-year deal with Série A side Santos.

Initially a backup option to Júlio Sérgio, Mauro featured regularly during the 2004 season as the club won the Série A title. He lost his starting spot to youth graduate Saulo during the 2005 campaign, and moved to Noroeste on 26 December of that year.

Mauro moved to São Caetano in April 2006, being a regular starter in his first year but being a backup to Luiz in his second. He left to return to Marília in December 2007, and represented Ituano and Paraná during a part of the 2008 season.

Mauro subsequently played for Mirassol, Mixto (two stints), Oeste, São José-SP, Volta Redonda and Resende before returning to his first club Mogi Mirim in April 2014. He was released by the latter on 24 December 2015, and retired shortly after.

Post-playing career
In 2016, Mauro returned to Santos to work as a goalkeeping coach of the youth categories.

Honours

Player
Santos
Campeonato Brasileiro Série A: 2004

Mixto
Campeonato Mato-Grossense Segunda Divisão: 2009

References

External links

1977 births
Living people
Footballers from São Paulo (state)
Brazilian footballers
Association football goalkeepers
Campeonato Brasileiro Série A players
Campeonato Brasileiro Série B players
Campeonato Brasileiro Série C players
Campeonato Brasileiro Série D players
Mogi Mirim Esporte Clube players
Santa Cruz Futebol Clube players
Marília Atlético Clube players
Santos FC players
Esporte Clube Noroeste players
Associação Desportiva São Caetano players
Ituano FC players
Paraná Clube players
Mirassol Futebol Clube players
Mixto Esporte Clube players
Oeste Futebol Clube players
São José Esporte Clube players
Volta Redonda FC players
Resende Futebol Clube players
Santos FC non-playing staff
People from Mogi Mirim